Forestdale is a village and census-designated place (CDP) within the town of Sandwich in Barnstable County, Massachusetts, United States. The population of Forestdale was 4,099 at the 2010 census. It is the most populous of the three CDPs in Sandwich. The ZIP code of Forestdale is 02644.

Geography
Forestdale is located in the southern part of Sandwich at  (41.683462, -70.512116). It is bordered by the town of Mashpee to the south and by Otis Air National Guard Base to the west. Massachusetts Route 130 (Forestdale Road) is the main route through the community, leading north to Sandwich village and south through Mashpee to Santuit in Barnstable.

Demographics

As of the census of 2000, there were 3,992 people, 1,307 households, and 1,049 families residing in the CDP. The population density was 415.5/km2 (1,076.2/mi2). There were 1,381 housing units at an average density of 143.7/km2 (372.3/mi2). The racial makeup of the CDP was 96.97% White, 0.85% African American, 0.58% Native American, 0.50% Asian, 0.35% from other races, and 0.75% from two or more races. Hispanic or Latino of any race were 1.28% of the population.

There were 1,307 households, out of which 49.0% had children under the age of 18 living with them, 68.8% were married couples living together, 8.8% had a female householder with no husband present, and 19.7% were non-families. 14.7% of all households were made up of individuals, and 5.4% had someone living alone who was 65 years of age or older. The average household size was 3.05 and the average family size was 3.42.

In the CDP, the population was spread out, with 33.8% under the age of 18, 5.0% from 18 to 24, 32.1% from 25 to 44, 21.3% from 45 to 64, and 7.9% who were 65 years of age or older. The median age was 34 years. For every 100 females, there were 100.1 males. For every 100 females age 18 and over, there were 93.0 males.

The median income for a household in the CDP was $62,072, and the median income for a family was $65,723. Males had a median income of $46,513 versus $29,271 for females. The per capita income for the CDP was $24,072. About 1.9% of families and 2.1% of the population were below the poverty line, including 1.5% of those under age 18 and 12.0% of those age 65 or over.

References

Census-designated places in Barnstable County, Massachusetts
Sandwich, Massachusetts
Census-designated places in Massachusetts